The 1909 Missouri Tigers football team was an American football team that represented the University of Missouri in the Missouri Valley Conference (MVC) during the 1909 college football season. The team compiled a 7–0–1 record (4–0–1 against MVC opponents) and outscored all opponents by a combined total of 86 to 36. Bill Roper was the head coach for the first and only season. The team played its home games at Rollins Field in Columbia, Missouri.

Schedule

References

Missouri
Missouri Tigers football seasons
College football undefeated seasons
Missouri Valley Conference football champion seasons
Missouri Tigers football